Bruno Fressato Cardoso (born 26 September 1984), simply known as Bruno Batata, is a Brazilian former footballer who played as a striker.

Career
Bruno has appeared mostly with Brazilian lower league teams throughout his career, but as Brøndby IF of the Danish Superliga was in need of a talented striker as cover up for injured Martin Bernburg, the club decided to loan him from Corinthians Paranaense in July 2010. Bruno scored his first goal in the Brøndby jersey in a match against OB on 22 August. 

He played in Campeonato Brasileiro Série B with Vila Nova Futebol Clube during 2008.

Bruno would later play for different lower league sides in Brazil, most notably Operário where he played from 2018. There, he scored a decisive goal in the Brazilian 2018 Série C finals against Cuiabá which secured the championship for Operário. His contract was terminated on 23 April 2020, which actively made him a free agent.

Bruno Batata announced his retirement in August 2020.

Honours 
 Coritiba
 Campeonato Paranaense: 2004

 Londrina
 Campeonato Paranaense: 2014

 Operário 
 Campeonato Brasileiro Série C: 2018

References

External links
 Superligaens transferliste

1984 births
Living people
Footballers from Curitiba
Brazilian footballers
Expatriate men's footballers in Denmark
Campeonato Brasileiro Série A players
Campeonato Brasileiro Série B players
Campeonato Brasileiro Série C players
Danish Superliga players
Coritiba Foot Ball Club players
Atlético Clube Paranavaí players
Cianorte Futebol Clube players
Londrina Esporte Clube players
J. Malucelli Futebol players
Vila Nova Futebol Clube players
Brøndby IF players
Ipatinga Futebol Clube players
Oeste Futebol Clube players
Joinville Esporte Clube players
Maringá Futebol Clube players
Operário Ferroviário Esporte Clube players
Association football forwards